Charles Bernard Obaikol Ebitu  was an Anglican bishop who served as Bishop of Soroti in Uganda.

External links
 Uganda Radio Network
 igihe
 All Africa

References

21st-century Anglican bishops in Uganda
Anglican bishops of Soroti
Uganda Christian University alumni